The two pterygopalatine nerves (or sphenopalatine branches) descend to the pterygopalatine ganglion.

Although it is closely related to the pterygopalatine ganglion, it is still considered a branch of the maxillary nerve and does not synapse in the ganglion.

It is found in the pterygopalatine fossa.

Additional images

References

Maxillary nerve